KDYS-LD, virtual and UHF digital channel 32, is a low-powered Daystar owned-and-operated television station licensed to Spokane, Washington, United States. The station is owned by the Word of God Fellowship.

History
The station was founded as K55EB on April 3, 1985 with a grant of an original construction permit to J-Pax Broadcasters to build a low-power television station on UHF channel 55 to serve Spokane. Almost immediately, J-Pax entered into an agreement to sell the permit to International Broadcast Consultants, Inc.; the sale was consummated December 10, 1985. International Broadcast Consultants completed construction of the station, which came on the air in September or October 1987 and was licensed November 18, 1987. Trinity Broadcasting Network (TBN) acquired the station from International Broadcast Consultants on July 27, 1989; the station then became a satellite repeater of TBN.

On January 16, 2007, needing to abandon its 700-MHz frequency, the station moved to UHF channel 32 and was assigned callsign K32GS.

A deal was reached to sell K32GS to Word of God Fellowship, owner of the Daystar Television Network, on March 19, 2010; the deal made K32GS a sister station to KQUP. Daystar changed the call letters to KDYS-LP.

On May 16, 2013, the station was issued its license for digital broadcasting, and the call sign was changed to KDYS-LD. The analog signal went off the air on May 11, 2013, and the digital signal went on the air in June.

At one time, TBN programming via satellite was also seen in Coeur d'Alene, Idaho on K53FF (channel 53).  K53EF was not named in the sale to Daystar (which already operates a low-power relay of KQUP in Coeur d'Alene); on April 1, 2010 it went silent due to declining support, which has been attributed to the digital transition. Its license, along with 43 other silent TBN repeaters, was canceled on December 1, 2011 for remaining silent over a year.

Digital television

Digital channel

References

External links
 

Television channels and stations established in 1985
Low-power television stations in the United States
DYS-LD
1985 establishments in Washington (state)